Muriel Rose Romanes  (born 18 March 1946) is a British former television actress and award-winning stage director. She is best known as a cast regular in the Scottish Television drama Take the High Road; and as the artistic director of the Stellar Quines Theatre Company in Edinburgh.

Career
Born in Cambridge, Romanes began her acting career as a student at the Royal Scottish Academy of Music and Drama. Having worked in Scottish theatre for many years, she played the part of schoolteacher Miss Welch in Gregory's Girl (1981). In 1980, she joined the cast of Take the High Road and, until 1989, played the part of Alice Taylor (née McEwan), one of the programme's longest-running characters.

After leaving Take the High Road, Romanes returned to theatre where she had many successes. She became an associate director at the Royal Lyceum Theatre in Edinburgh where she directed several acclaimed productions, including The Deep Blue Sea, A Listening Heaven, Lavender Blue, A Streetcar Named Desire, The Prime of Miss Jean Brodie, and Anna Karenina. In 1993, she was a founder member of the Stellar Quines Theatre Company in Edinburgh and, in 1996, became its first artistic director. Romanes held this post until she retired in 2015. Romanes was a frequent visiting lecturer and director at the Drama School of Edinburgh’s Queen Margaret University where she directed a number of productions.

Honours
On 12 June 2016, following her retirement, the Critics' Awards for Theatre in Scotland (CATS) presented Romanes with the prestigious "CATS Whiskers" award for outstanding achievement "in supporting and strengthening women’s role in Scottish theatre", most notably as the first artistic director of Stellar Quines. She was appointed Member of the Order of the British Empire (MBE) in the 2016 Birthday Honours for services to drama.

References

Bibliography

External links
 

1946 births
Living people
British theatre people
Members of the Order of the British Empire
People from Cambridge
Scottish soap opera actresses
Scottish television actresses
Scottish theatre directors
Take the High Road